Fidarreh, also rendered as Fudarreh and Fedreh, may refer to:
 Bala Fidarreh
 Pain Fidarreh